The Rural Municipality of Buchanan No. 304 is a rural municipality (RM) in the Canadian province of Saskatchewan within Census Division No. 9 and  Division No. 4.

History 
The RM of Buchanan No. 304 incorporated as a rural municipality on January 1, 1913.

Geography

Communities and localities 
The following urban municipalities are surrounding by the RM.

Villages
 Buchanan

The following unincorporated communities are located in the RM.

Organized hamlets
 Amsterdam
 Tadmore

Localities
 Mitchellview
 Tiny

Demographics 

Government 
The RM of Buchanan No. 304 is governed by an elected municipal council and an appointed administrator that meets on the first Wednesday of every month. The reeve of the RM is Don Skoretz while its administrator is Twila Hadubiak. The RM's office is located in Buchanan.

See also 
List of rural municipalities in Saskatchewan

References 

B

Division No. 9, Saskatchewan